Tropic Madness is a 1928 American drama film directed by Robert G. Vignola, written by Randolph Bartlett and Wyndham Gittens, and starring Leatrice Joy, Lena Malena, George Barraud, Henry Sedley, Albert Valentino and David Durand. It was released on December 19, 1928, by Film Booking Offices of America.

Cast
Leatrice Joy as Juanita
Lena Malena as Koki
George Barraud as Henderson
Henry Sedley as Johnson
Albert Valentino as Lennox
David Durand as Frankie

References

External links
 

1928 films
1920s English-language films
Silent American drama films
1928 drama films
Film Booking Offices of America films
Films directed by Robert G. Vignola
American silent feature films
American black-and-white films
1920s American films